Dávid Hancko (born 13 December 1997) is a Slovak professional footballer who plays as a centre-back or left-back for Eredivisie club Feyenoord and the Slovakia national team.

Club career

MŠK Žilina
Hancko made his Slovak Super Liga debut for Žilina against ŽP Šport Podrbezová on 12 March 2016. He also played in 45 fixtures, scoring 11 goals, in the reserves team, between 2014 and 2018.

He was included by UEFA on its list of most promising talents for 2018.

Fiorentina
On 14 June 2018, it was announced that Hancko had signed a five-year contract with Fiorentina.  He played in multiple friendly pre-season fixtures, but made his competitive debut on 22 September 2018, after being benched for four matches, during a 3–0 home victory over S.P.A.L., substituting Cristiano Biraghi at half time. His performance was generally well received, receiving an average mark of 7.0/10 by the Sofascore internet portal.

During January 2019 transfer window, it was reported that Zenit Saint Peterburg were looking to sign Hancko on a half-season loan, for €500,000, with an option to buy for €20 million. At this point, Hancko had only started as a substitute in two Serie A games, but was important for the national team in October and November fixtures of UEFA Nations League. Nonetheless, Fiorentina did not agree to the terms of the deal.

In the season, Hancko was in the starting eleven of games against Juventus, playing the entire match, and Napoli, the top two teams in the league table, despite not being fielded in other, minor matches.

Sparta Prague
On 31 July 2022 in a 1–2 home loss against Slovan Liberec Hancko made his 100th appearance for Sparta Prague.

Feyenoord 
On 22 August 2022, Hancko joined Feyenoord on a free transfer, signing a four-year contract. He made his debut five days later against FC Emmen, and provided the assist which enabled Quinten Timber to score the first goal in a 4–0 win for Feyenoord.

International career
Hancko was initially called up to Slovakia's senior national team on 2 October 2018 by the coach Ján Kozák, shortly after his debut in Serie A, for matches against Czech Republic (a part of 2018–19 UEFA Nations League) and a friendly against Sweden later in October. Hancko was fielded in the match against Czech Republic, in the 80th minute, substituting left-back Tomáš Hubočan. He also played a game under Štefan Tarkovič on 16 October 2018, who managed the team on caretaker basis, against Sweden, since Kozák resigned on 14 October 2018.

After the international retirement of Tomáš Hubočan in February 2019, Hancko was nominated as the preferred choice as a left-back, playing the entirety of a qualifying match against Hungary on 21 March 2019. As in previous matches, Hancko presented himself with a quite offensive football, at times playing in the line with attacking midfielders.

Personal life 
Since the end of 2020, he has been in a relationship with Czech tennis player Kristýna Plíšková, in July 2021 they got married; they have a son.

Career statistics

Scores and results list Slovakia's goal tally first, score column indicates score after each Hancko goal.

Honours
Sparta Prague
 Czech Cup: 2019–20

Individual
Peter Dubovský Award: 2018

References

External links
 MŠK Žilina official club profile
 
 Futbalnet profile
 Fortuna Liga profile
 Eurofotbal profile

1997 births
Living people
People from Prievidza
Sportspeople from the Trenčín Region
Slovak footballers
Association football defenders
Slovakia international footballers
Slovakia under-21 international footballers
Slovakia youth international footballers
UEFA Euro 2020 players
Slovak Super Liga players
Serie A players
Czech First League players
MŠK Žilina players
ACF Fiorentina players
AC Sparta Prague players
Slovak expatriate footballers
Slovak expatriate sportspeople in the Czech Republic
Expatriate footballers in the Czech Republic
Slovak expatriate sportspeople in Italy
Expatriate footballers in Italy